Pussy Cats is the tenth album by American singer Harry Nilsson, released by RCA Records in 1974. It was produced by John Lennon during his "Lost Weekend" period. The album title was inspired by the bad press Nilsson and Lennon were getting at the time for being drunk and rowdy in Los Angeles. They also included an inside joke on the cover – children's letter blocks "D" and "S" on either side of a rug under a table − to spell out "drugs under the table" as a rebus.

Recording and development
The album was started in Los Angeles, but Lennon ultimately finished producing it in New York, where he could better control the sessions. During the recording sessions, Nilsson ruptured one of his vocal cords but chose to keep this from Lennon. He forced himself to push through the sessions, which caused even more damage, that some (including The Monkees' Micky Dolenz) say he never quite recovered from. The vocal strain is most evident on "Old Forgotten Soldier" and "Loop de Loop," on the latter of which Nilsson's vocals are heavily masked by backing vocals.

The album's intended original title, Strange Pussies, was rejected by RCA Records and modified to Pussy Cats. Among the many musicians on Pussy Cats are drummers Ringo Starr, Keith Moon and Jim Keltner, who all play together on the closing track, "Rock Around the Clock", using three separate drum kits. Other contributors include Jesse Ed Davis, Klaus Voormann, and Bobby Keys.

A quadrophonic version was released on record and eight-track tape. The songs were treated to special mixes for that issue of the album.

Half of the album's original ten tracks were covers while the rest were written by Nilsson (with Lennon co-writing "Mucho Mungo/Mt. Elga").

After the first night of recording, March 28, Paul McCartney and Stevie Wonder popped into the studio unexpectedly. Bootleg recordings from the session were later released as the album A Toot and a Snore in '74. It is the only known instance of Lennon and McCartney recording together since the break-up of the Beatles.

Release
The album was released August 19, 1974 in the US and August 30, 1974 in the UK.

Longtime Beatles publicist Derek Taylor, who produced A Little Touch of Schmilsson in the Night, wrote the liner notes for the original Pussy Cats pressing. In it, he referred to the album's notorious recording background and quipped, "Harry, and John [...] have been living a vampire turntable recently but have sucked no blood except each other's and not so much of that, [...] Anyway, the cross-transfusion works, so what the hell." Lennon was annoyed that the Mast Albert Choir was listed in the credits as "Masked Albert Choir."

The album got a lukewarm reception, peaking at #60 on the US Billboard album charts. Nilsson's subsequent RCA releases would chart far lower.

Legacy
In June 1999, a commemorative 25th-anniversary edition of Pussy Cats was released.

In October 2006, a track-by-track cover of the album was released by indie rock band The Walkmen. Several covers of the song "Don't Forget Me" have appeared, including Marshall Crenshaw's treatment on the 1995 Nilsson tribute For the Love of Harry: Everybody Sings Nilsson,  alt-country artist Neko Case's March 2009 version on her ANTI- label release, Middle Cyclone, and Mamie Minch's contribution to 2014's tribute to Nilsson by various indie artists This Is the Town: A Tribute to Nilsson, Vol. 1.

Track listing

Charts

Personnel

Harry Nilsson – vocals, piano (3, 5), electric piano (8, 10), clavinet (2), arrangements (3–10)
Jesse Ed Davis – guitar (1, 2, 4, 5, 6, 7, 8, 10)
Danny Kortchmar – guitar (1, 2, 4, 6, 7, 8, 10)
Sneaky Pete Kleinow – pedal steel guitar (1, 2, 4, 6)
Ken Ascher – piano (1, 4, 7), electric piano (2), orchestration, conducting
Jane Getz – piano (6, 8, 10)
Willie Smith – organ (1)
Klaus Voormann – bass (1, 2, 4, 5, 6, 7, 8, 10)
Jim Keltner – drums (1, 2, 4, 6, 7, 8, 10)
Ringo Starr – drums (1, 2, 4, 6, 8, 10), maracas (7)
Keith Moon – drums (8, 10), congas (7), Chinese wood blocks (4)
Doug Hoefer – snare drum (2)
Cynthia Webb – maracas (7)
Bobby Keys – saxophone (1, 2, 4, 6, 7, 8, 10)
Trevor Lawrence – saxophone (2, 6, 7, 8, 10)
Jim Horn – saxophone (8, 10)
Gene Cipriano – saxophone (6)
Tony Terran – trumpet (8, 10)
Chuck Findley – trumpet (8, 10)
The Masked Alberts Orchestra – strings (1, 3, 4, 6, 7, 9)
Nathalie Altman, Susie Bell, Troy Germano, Erik Mueller, Rachel Mueller, Phylida Paterson, Peri Prestopino, David Steinberg, Cantey Turner, Kristin Turner, Damon Vigiano – the Masked Albert Kids Chorale (8)

Production and technical personnel
John Lennon – producer, arrangements (1, 2, 4, 6, 7, 8, 10)
Roy Cicala – engineer, assistant producer
Jimmy Iovine – assistant engineer
Mal Evans – production assistant
Ringo Starr – production assistant
Dennis Ferrante – Editing mixing
Tom Rabstenak, Greg Calbi – mastering
Cally – artwork, design, photography
Acy R. Lehman – art direction
Andrea T. Sheridan – liner notes
Derek Taylor – liner notes
Eddie Eddings – research
Mike Hartry – digital transfers
Bill Lacey – audio restoration
Keith Munro – producer, coordination
Curtis Armstrong – liner notes (reissue)

See also
Rock 'n' Roll

References

External links
Pussy Cats at The Harry Nilsson Website

Harry Nilsson albums
1974 albums
RCA Records albums
Albums produced by John Lennon